Chengdu Tianfu International Airport  is a major air hub of Western China and one of the two international airports serving Chengdu, the capital of China's Sichuan province, the other one being Chengdu Shuangliu International Airport (CTU). 

The airport was located at Lujia Town, Jianyang, Chengdu, 51 kilometers (32 mi) southeast from Downtown Chengdu. It is named after the Tianfu New Area, a development zone for Chengdu in which the airport is. Construction began in May 2016 and the airport opened on 27 June 2021.

History 

Plans for a new airport for Chengdu were in place since 2007. In May 2011, officials confirmed the planning process for selecting a location had started. In June 2013, the Civil Aviation Administration of China officially confirmed and approved Jianyang's Lujia Town as the location for the new airport.

In January 2015, the State Council and Central Military Commission approved the new airport project, and the official name Chengdu Tianfu International Airport was finalized by the Civil Aviation Administration of China in September 2015.

In January 2021, flight testing was done and on 27 June 2021, the first commercial flight departed from the airport.

Design
The airport is intended to become the third-largest airport hub in China, after Beijing and Shanghai. The airport opened with three runways (two north-south and one east-west) with two terminals with a capacity of 60 million passengers per year by 2025 and a cargo capacity of 24.45 thousand tones. 

The full plan includes six runways and four terminals with capacity to handle 90 million passengers per year. On June 1, 2015, the Sichuan Provincial Airport Group announced a general design scheme for the airport. The winning design was by China Southwest Architectural Design and Research Institute, China Airport Construction Group Corporation, and French architectural firm ADP Ingenierie. 

The airport features two terminal buildings in the shape of the mythical Sunbird, used as a logo for the city of Chengdu. From a central hollow circular core, 6 arms radiate outwards with both terminals mirroring the other.

Airlines and destinations
Tianfu is a major base for Air China. The flag carrier operates maintenance facilities, a 1,500 bed staff hostel and a  lounge at the airport. Due to the COVID-19 pandemic, the airport currently does not operate international flights. However, operation of international flights will begin in March 2023 and it is planned for Tianfu to take over most international and cargo routes from Shuangliu, with the latter specializing in domestic flights. Beginning from March 28th, 2023, Air China will change the flight to Taipei Taoyuan from Chengdu Shuangliu to Chengdu Tianfu.

Passenger

Cargo

Ground transportation

Internal transportation
The two airport terminals will be connected by an Innovia automated people mover (APM) supplied by joint venture firm Puzhen Bombardier Transportation Systems Limited, which has also won the operations and maintenance contract.

Short term

Connections open:
 Chengdu Tianfu International Airport Expressway connecting the airport to Chengdu's Third Ring Road. Opened December 2020.
 Chengdu Metro Line 18 - Connection to Chengdu South railway station (future extended to Chengdu railway station), opened December 2020.

Construction planned to be completed in time for the opening of the new terminal (status uncertain):
 Ziyang - Sanchahu Lake (Jianyang) Highway
 Jianyang - Tianfu Airport - Renshou  Highway

Medium term
 Extension of the Chengdu Metro Line 19, on shared tracks with Line 18, to provide a 30-minute connection to the existing Chengdu Shuangliu International Airport .

 High-speed Rail connection as part of the Chengdu–Zigong high-speed railway connecting to Chengdu East railway station, Chengdu Tianfu railway station,  Zigong,  Ziyang and Neijaing.

See also
List of airports in China
List of the busiest airports in China

References

Airports in Sichuan
Airports established in 2021
2021 establishments in China
Transport in Chengdu
Buildings and structures in Chengdu